Madaras is a village in Bács-Kiskun county, Hungary.

Populated places in Bács-Kiskun County
Places in Bačka